Play with Me is the only studio album by Norwegian singer Lene. It was released on 21 September 2003 by Polydor Records.

Chart performance
The album charted at #30 in Denmark and #74 in Norway.

Track listing

Release history

References

2003 debut albums
Lene Nystrøm albums
Polydor Records albums
Albums produced by Brian Rawling